Jeremiah Hayes may refer to:

Jeremiah Hayes (filmmaker), Canadian film editor and director
Jeremiah F. Hayes, professor of electrical engineering